was a town located in Nishisonogi District, Nagasaki Prefecture, Japan.

As of 2003, the town had an estimated population of 12,518 and a density of 185.10 persons per km². The total area was 67.63 km².

On January 4, 2006, Kinkai was merged into the expanded city of Nagasaki.

External links
 Kinkai Official site at WARP (Web Archiving Project), National Diet Library
 

Dissolved municipalities of Nagasaki Prefecture